Irene Barberis, is an Australian artist, based in Melbourne and London. She is a painter primarily, working also with installation, drawing, and new media art. She is also the founding director of an international arts research centre, and is an international curator and writer.

Life
Barberis was born in Chiswick in London, in 1953.  She grew up in rural Victoria and began studying classical ballet at the age of three, giving it up after an injury at the age of nineteen. Barberis became the partner of the Australian artist Robert Hunter between 1973 and 1977, travelling with him to New York, for his exhibition at the Museum of Modern Art, and then to Europe. Returning to Australia from this journey, aged 22, she completed her BFA at the Preston Institute with friends, peers and lecturers including Peter Booth, Dale Hickey, Dominico De Clario. De Clario included her in her first group exhibition in 1976, Drawing Some Definitions at the then George Paton Gallery, Melbourne University. She completed a Post Graduate Diploma of Art at the Victorian College of the Arts, VCA, in Melbourne. On receiving the 1979 Keith and Elizabeth Murdoch Fellowship from the VCA, Barberis travelled to Paris in late 1979 after receiving an Australia Council Grant and receiving the Australian Power Studio at the Cite des Arts, Paris. She lived, worked and exhibited at the Cite des Arts from 1980, returning to Australia in late 1982. She married Australian sculptor Adrian L. Page in 1984 and in 1988 had their one child Rebekah Georgia Page. She completed an MFA at the Victorian College of the Arts, Melbourne University in 1994 and a PhD on Abstract and Figurative Elements of the Apocalypse and its Representations in 2000. She is a Senior lecturer at the RMIT University School of Art and lectures in painting in the School of Art program in Hong Kong, at the Hong Kong Art School. She is the Founder and Director of the Global Centre for Drawing, Director of Metasenta Publications in Melbourne, Australia. and is Co Director of Gallery Langford120 (with Wilma Tabacco).  Barberis has been the International Critic for the New York-based, 'Rome Art Program' for five years and is associated with the SACI Institute in Florence, Italy.

Metasenta
Barberis is the founding director of Metasenta an international arts research hub, supported by a number of universities including RMIT University in Melbourne and the University of the Arts, London. She has been director of its hubs and projects since this time. Her work with Metasenta has included initiating international art projects, exhibitions, publications and films. She founded and directed the mobile gallery, The DrawingSpace, Melbourne, an extension of her 2004 Public Arts Commission, A Kineaesthetic Experience: 10 Works which utilised dormant spaces around Frankston, Victoria. Metasenta is known for published and commissioned books.  For example, Barberis, on behalf of Metasenta, commissioned a new survey of Australian drawing, Contemporary Australian Drawing #1.

Barberis curated the large international survey exhibition Across the Gulf; Bahrain Dubai and Abu Dhabi: 22 Artists for the 2009 Arc Biennial Brisbane.  Barberis has also concentrated on major drawing exhibitions including in 2010 Contemporary Australian Drawing#1, 35 Artists, RMIT Gallery, and Contemporary Australian Drawing #2, 84 Artists, University of the Arts London, Gallery Langford 120, 2012. She was international Chair of the Conference" Crossing the Line: Drawing in the Middle East", which formed a dialogue through drawing at the beginning of the Arab Spring. Crossing the Line: Drawing in the Middle East2 Conference was held in Dubai in September 2014 in which Barberis was the initiator and  International Chair. Contemporary Australian Drawing #4 was held in September 2013 at the New York Studio School and included 94 Australian Artists. A number of Barberis' initiatives and philosophies on Drawing through the university systems, Galleries and Drawing Centres is documented in the June Issue of the Australian Journal, ''Imprint', 'The Good Drawing', University of the Arts London, 2012 and "The Drawn Word; even if I write my name I am drawing", 2014.

Work
Barberis has been making art since the mid-1970s, and was a post graduate of the Victorian College of the Arts, winning the Keith and Elizabeth Murdoch Travelling Fellowship in 1979. She gradually adopted Biblical subject matter in her work. She has exhibited internationally since the 1980s. In 2005, she initiated and was part of the exhibition "Intersections: Reading the Space" at the Jewish Museum of Australia, which was exhibited in 2005 at the Contemporary Jewish Museum of San Francisco.  Other exhibitions include "Trancentric," London, 2008, "The Agency of Words"  Lethaby Gallery, London, Text Festival 2009, Bury Museum and Art Gallery, Manchester, UK, "Apocalypse; Seven Histories into Futures", Arc Biennial 2009, Brisbane, Australia,  'Lines of Thinking, Langford120 in 2011, and Apocalypse/Revelation: Re Looking, 2012. Her major project 'The Tapestry of Light' in collaboration with 4 international scholars including Emerita Professor Michelle.P. Brown ( University of London), and Scientist, Professor David Mainwaring ( Swinburne University), is in process and is due for completion in 2017. The Visual Arts Centre, La Trobe University, Bendigo has hosted the latest exhibition which includes works made by the Australian Tapestry Workshop.

References

External links
  Irene Barberis homepage
  Metasenta

1953 births
Living people
20th-century Australian women artists
20th-century Australian artists
21st-century Australian women artists
21st-century Australian artists
Artists from London
Artists from Melbourne
RMIT University alumni
Academic staff of RMIT University
Victorian College of the Arts alumni